Carlton J. Kell High School is a public high school in the Cobb County School District in the US state of Georgia. The school is located in unincorporated Cobb County with a Marietta address, just northwest of Atlanta.  The school was founded in 2002 and serves students in the Cobb County area. It is also an Advanced Placement Certified School.

History
Carlton J. Kell High School was established in 2002. It was named after a prominent coach in the Cobb County School District.

Demographics
The demographic breakdown of the 1,568 students enrolled for the 2012–2013 school year was:

Male - 52.1%
Native American/Alaskan - 0.8%
Asian/Pacific Islander - 2.6%
Black - 21.5%
Female - 47.9%
Hispanic - 10.4%
White - 61.6%
Multiracial - 3.1%

Additionally, 32.6% of the enrolled students qualified for free or reduced lunch.

Notable alumni
 Jonathan Dwyer, 2007, football player; played for the Pittsburgh Steelers and Arizona Cardinals
 Scoot Henderson, 2021, professional basketball player for NBA G League Ignite
 Christine Ko, 2006, actress
 Brendan Langley, 2013, NFL cornerback for the Denver Broncos
 Quincy Mauger, (2013), NFL Safety for Atlanta Falcons.
 Adam Morgan, 2008, professional baseball player for the Philadelphia Phillies
 Ben Paulsen, 2006, professional baseball player
 Zeke Spruill, 2008, professional baseball player for the Lamigo Monkeys of the CPBL
 Lucas Till, 2008, actor
 Mike Will Made It (Michael Len Williams), 2007, music producer

References

External links
 Official site

Schools in Cobb County, Georgia
Educational institutions established in 2002
Public high schools in Georgia (U.S. state)
2002 establishments in Georgia (U.S. state)